Faecalibacillus is a Gram-positive, obligately anaerobic long-rod-shaped and non-spore-forming genus from the family of Erysipelotrichidae with one known species (Faecalibacillus intestinalis). Faecalibacillus intestinalis has been isolated from human faeces.

See also
 List of bacterial orders
 List of bacteria genera

References 

Erysipelotrichia
Bacteria genera
Taxa described in 2019
Monotypic bacteria genera